These are the results of the women's K-1 slalom competition in canoeing at the 1972 Summer Olympics. The K-1 (kayak single) event is raced by one-person kayaks through a whitewater course.  The venue for the 1972 Olympic competition was in Augsburg.

Medalists

Results
The 22 competitors each took two runs through the whitewater slalom course on August 30. The best time of the two runs counted for the event.

References

1972 Summer Olympics official report Volume 3. p. 499. 
1972 women's slalom K-1 results

Women's Slalom K-1
Olympic
Women's events at the 1972 Summer Olympics